The Perry County Courthouse is a historic courthouse building located in New Bloomfield, Perry County, Pennsylvania. The courthouse was built in 1826 and completed the next year. It was extensively altered in 1868 and is in the Greek Revival style. It is a two-story white brick structure, three bays wide and six bays long. The low hipped roof is crowned by a cupola dated to 1826. An annex was completed about 1892.

It was listed on the National Register of Historic Places in 1975.

See also 
 National Register of Historic Places listings in Perry County, Pennsylvania
 List of state and county courthouses in Pennsylvania

References

External links
Perry County, Pennsylvania website

County courthouses in Pennsylvania
Buildings and structures in Perry County, Pennsylvania
Government of Perry County, Pennsylvania
Government buildings completed in 1826
Courthouses on the National Register of Historic Places in Pennsylvania
National Register of Historic Places in Perry County, Pennsylvania
1826 establishments in Pennsylvania
Clock towers in Pennsylvania
Neoclassical architecture in Pennsylvania